The Chennai Veerans was a Tier-1 level field hockey team Premier Hockey League in India. In the inaugural cup in 2005, the Chennai Veerans led by Ignace Tirkey finished at the bottom of the group with two wins and six losses.

After finishing at the bottom of the premier division in the inaugural PHL in year 2005, Chennai Veerans were relegated to Tier-II division of PHL in 2006, where they played along with Orissa Steelers, Lucknow Nawabs, Delhi Dazzlers and Imphal Rangers. In this league Chennai Veerans finished runners-up to Orissa Steelers. 
It was later decided that in 2007 no team should be relegated from Tier I. Instead 2 teams were added to the premier division [Tier-I]. So 7 teams entered the current Tier-I of 3rd PHL-2007 - 1) Sher-e-jalandhar, 2) Orissa Steelers, 3) Bangalore Lions, 4) Maratha Warriors, 5) Chennai Veerans, 6) Chandigarh Dynamos, and the Tier-II division was scrapped for the year 2007 by the IHF.

Players name for year 2005
 Ignace Tirkey (Captain)
Devesh Chauhan (G.K.)
Rajarajan (G.K) 
William Xalxo 
Nitin Kumar 
Jagath Jothi 
Vivek Gupta 
Bimal Lakra 
Prabakaran 
Jagan Senthil 
Adam Sinclair
Venkatesh 
Raja 
Birender Lakra 
Sundeep Singh
Dilawar Hussain (Pakistan)
Zeeshan Ashraf (Pakistan) 
Juan Escarré (Spain)
Harender Singh (Chief Coach)
Rama Swamy (Asst Coach)
Saju Joseph (Trainer)
Venkatachalam (Stand In Manager)
T.A. Jabaratnam (Manager)

The current team of Chennai Veerans in 2007 PHL is led by Adam Sinclair.

Their brand ambassador for the 2007 season is actor Madhavan

Results of Chennai Veerans
 2005 - 5th place in Tier-I [Premier] division
 2006 - 2nd place in Tier-II division
 2007 - 6th place of Tier-I [Premier] division.

References
Premiere Hockey League

Indian field hockey clubs
Premier Hockey League teams
Sports clubs in India
Year of establishment missing